Gerald Joseph Wilfred Arthur Couture (August 6, 1925 — July 13, 1994) was a Canadian ice hockey centre. He played in the National Hockey League with the Detroit Red Wings, Montreal Canadiens, and Chicago Black Hawks between 1945 and 1954. With Detroit he won the Stanley Cup in 1950.

Playing career
Couture started his National Hockey League career with the Detroit Red Wings in the 1945 Stanley Cup Playoffs. He would also play for the Montreal Canadiens and Chicago Black Hawks. He left the NHL after the 1954 season. He played in the minors the rest of his career before retiring from hockey after 1960. He won the Stanley Cup in 1950 with the Detroit Red Wings.

Career statistics

Regular season and playoffs

References

External links
 

1925 births
1994 deaths
Buffalo Bisons (AHL) players
Calgary Stampeders (WHL) players
Canadian ice hockey centres
Chicago Blackhawks players
Cleveland Barons (1937–1973) players
Detroit Red Wings players
Ice hockey people from Saskatchewan
Indianapolis Capitals players
Montreal Canadiens players
Providence Reds players
Saskatchewan Huskies ice hockey players
Saskatoon Regals/St. Paul Saints players
Sportspeople from Saskatoon
Stanley Cup champions